Aspistor luniscutis is a species of sea catfish found along the coasts of French Guiana and Brazil.  This species attains a length of 120 cm TL.

References

 

Ariidae
Fish of South America
Fish of Brazil
Fish of French Guiana
Fish described in 1840